Gokuldham is a densely populated neighborhood in Mumbai, India, close to Goregaon railway station. It has over a hundred residential buildings from 5 to 45 floors high and forthcoming constructions are promised to be higher. 

There are several schools in Gokuldham, Yashodham High School & Jr College, St Xavier's High School, Oberoi International School, Gokuldham High School, Lakshdham High School and Ryan International School. Also, Gokuldham has its own shopping malls & complexes (Oberoi Mall, Shagun Mall, Gagan Shopping Arcade). The local population congregates in and around the large temple  - Gokuldham Temple - located near the entrance. There are many grounds and maidans here too.

In popular culture
 Fictional setting of Gokuldham society in Taarak Mehta Ka Ooltah Chashmah sitcom is purportedly located in Goregaon.

References

Neighbourhoods in Mumbai